Stubal may refer to:

 Stubal (Vladičin Han), a village in Serbia
 Stubal (Aleksandrovac), a village in Serbia
 Stubal (Blace), a village in Serbia
 Stubal (Kraljevo), a village in Serbia